Lê Thị Quý (1950) is a Vietnamese sociologist and Women's Rights activist. She founded Institute for Gender and Development (INGAD) in 2013 and held the position of the director until 2015. She was accredited with being the first person doing research on domestic violence in Vietnam. In 2005, she was one of the 1,000 women nominated for the Nobel Peace Prize. She has been recognized for her contributions to gender research and domestic violence mitigation in Vietnam.

Profile 
Lê Thị Quý was born in 1950 in Bac Ninh province, Vietnam. In 1971, she graduated from University of Hanoi with bachelor's degree of History. She went to Moscow for a post-graduate program studying about History in 1984. In 1989, she succeeded with her doctoral thesis defense at USSR Academy of Sciences and was awarded a Doctor of Philosophy Degree. She was recognized as the Associate Professor in 2002 and Professor of Sociology in Hanoi in 2010.

From 2001 to 2010, she worked at Faculty of Sociology of University of Social Sciences and Humanities (USSH), Hanoi. She was the director of Center of Gender and Development of USSH from 2002 to 2013 before founding Institute for Gender and Development (INGAD) managed by Vietnam Union of Science and Technology Associations - VUSTA in 2013. She worked there as the director from 2013 to 2015. She also worked at Department of Social Work of Thang Long University, Hanoi.

Her research mainly focuses on theories of Feminism, Women and Social Evils.

Career  
Lê Thị Quý's studies focus on gender issues, including prostitution, domestic violence and women trafficking. She has written 14 books, co-authored 58 books and 90 scientific journal articles about prostitution, domestic violence and women trafficking. She aims at creating a better and more equal society for women.

Her very first steps with Sociology started when Lê Thị Quý and her family moved to Ho Chi Minh City in 1975. In addition to History, she started Sociology research with the support and guide of her husband - Professor Đặng Vũ Cảnh Khanh.

During the period from 1977 to 1981, she had her first studies on prostitution in Saigon.

After having her PhD from USSR Academy of Sciences, she had further studies on prostitution, women and children trafficking which were considered to be sensitive issues at that time.

In 1996, together with a few researchers from Netherlands, Cambodia, Thailand, Lê Thị Quý was the first person to start project about prevention of cross-border women trafficking in Vietnam. After the project, her research on prevention of cross-border women and children trafficking was published in 2000.

In 2002, she invented domestic violence prevention ideas with a project called "House of Refuge in the Community” in two domestic violence hotspots which were Thanh Ne (in Kien Xuong District, Thai Binh Province) and Vu Lac Commune (in Thai Binh). The project involved local police, veterans' and women's association to protect women from their husbands' violence. Under the project, domestic violence decreased by 90% as compared to that in the past.

In 2005, she was among 1,000 female nominees for the Nobel Peace Prize.

In 2010, she was the first female Professor in Sociology in Vietnam.

In 2013, she founded Institute for Gender and Development (INGAD) which is under the management of Vietnam Union of Science and Technology Associations - VUSTA.

Family 

In 1974, Lê Thị Quý married the Sociology Professor Đặng Vũ Cảnh Khanh (1947) - the former director of Youth Research Institute, son of Professor Vũ Khiêu (1916) - the first director of  Institute of Sociology. They have one son named Đặng Vũ Cảnh Linh (1974) - Deputy Manager of Information Department at Vietnam Union of Science and Technology Associations - VUSTA.

Book and research highlights 
 Vấn đề ngăn chặn nạn buôn bán phụ nữ ở Việt Nam, Labour and Social Publisher Company Limited, 2000.
 Bạo lực gia đình - Một sự sai lệch giá trị (co-author), Social Sciences Publishing House, 2007.
 Mại dâm, quan điểm và giải pháp, Ministry of Labour, Invalids and Social Affairs, 2000.
 Gia đình học (co-author with her husband Professor Đặng Cảnh Khanh), The Publishing House of Political Theory, 2007.
 Giáo trình Xã hội học Giới, Vietnam Education Publishing House Limited Company, 2010.
 Giáo trình Xã hội học Gia đình, Politics - Administration Publishing House, 2011.
 Domestic Violence in Vietnam: Context, Forms, Causes, and Recommendations for Action. Mekong Region Consultation Series, Asia Pacific Forum on Women Law and Development, Chiang Mai, 2000.

References 

Women's rights activists
Vietnamese sociologists
1950 births
Living people